Polybrominated diphenyl ethers or PBDEs, are a class of organobromine compounds that are used as flame retardants. Like other brominated flame retardants, PBDEs have been used in a wide array of products, including building materials, electronics, furnishings, motor vehicles, airplanes, plastics, polyurethane foams, and textiles.  They are structurally akin to polychlorinated diphenyl ethers (PCDEs), polychlorinated biphenyls (PCBs) and other polyhalogenated compounds, consisting of two halogenated aromatic rings. PBDEs are classified according to the average number of bromine atoms in the molecule.  The health hazards of these chemicals have attracted increasing scrutiny, and they have been shown to reduce fertility in humans at levels found in households.  Because of their toxicity and persistence, the industrial production of some PBDEs is restricted under the Stockholm Convention, a treaty to control and phase out major persistent organic pollutants (POPs).

Classes of PBDEs

The family of PBDEs consists of 209 possible substances, which are called congeners (PBDE = C12H(10−x)BrxO (x = 1, 2, ..., 10 = m + n)).  The number of isomers for mono-, di-, tri-, tetra-, penta-, hexa-, hepta-, octa-, nona-, and decabromodiphenyl ethers are 3, 12, 24, 42, 46, 42, 24, 12, 3 and 1, respectively. In the United States, PBDEs are marketed with the trade names DE-60F, DE-61, DE-62, and DE-71 applied to pentaBDE mixtures, DE-79 applied to octaBDE mixtures, and DE 83R and Saytex 102E applied to decaBDE mixtures. The available commercial PBDE products are not single compounds or even single congeners but rather mixtures of congeners.

Lower brominated PBDEs
These species average 1–4 bromine atoms per molecule and are regarded as more dangerous because they more efficiently bioaccumulate. Lower-brominated PBDEs have been known to affect hormone levels in the thyroid gland. Studies have linked them to reproductive and neurological risks at certain concentrations or higher.

Higher brominated PBDEs
These species have average 5 or more bromine atoms per molecule.

The commercial mixture, named pentabromodiphenyl ether contains the pentabromo derivative predominantly (50–62%); however, the mixture also contains tetrabromides (24–38%) and hexabromides (4–8%), as well as traces of the tribromides (0–1%). In similar manner, commercial octabromodiphenyl ether is a mixture of homologs: hexa-, hepta-, octa-, nona-, and decabromides.

Health and environmental concerns
Since the 1990s, environmental concerns were raised because of the high hydrophobicity of PBDEs and their high resistance to degradation processes. People are exposed to low levels of PBDEs through ingestion of food and by inhalation. PBDEs bioaccumulate in blood, breast milk, and fat tissues. Personnel associated with the manufacture of PBDE-containing products are exposed to highest levels of PBDEs. Bioaccumulation is of particular concern in such instances, especially for personnel in recycling and repair plants working on PBDE-containing products. People are also exposed to these chemicals in their domestic environment because of their prevalence in common household items. Studies in Canada have found significant concentrations of PBDEs in common foods such as salmon, ground beef, butter, and cheese. PBDEs have also been found at high levels in indoor dust, sewage sludge, and effluents from wastewater treatment plants. Increasing PBDE levels have been detected in the blood of marine mammals such as harbor seals.

There is also growing concern that PBDEs share the environmental long life and bioaccumulation properties of polychlorinated dibenzodioxins.

It is not known if PBDEs can cause cancer in people, although liver tumors developed in rats and mice that ate extremely large amounts of decaBDE throughout their lifetime. Lower-brominated PBDEs have not yet been tested for cancer in animals. The International Agency for Research on Cancer (IARC) has classified PBDE as a Group 3 carcinogen (not classifiable as to its carcinogenicity to humans) based on inadequate evidence of carcinogenicity in humans and inadequate or limited evidence in experimental animals. The EPA assigns the cancer category Group D (not classifiable as to human carcinogenicity) to mono-, di-, tri-, tetra-, penta-, hexa-, octa-, and nonaBDEs and reports “inadequate information” to classify the specific congeners 2,2’,4,4’-tetraBDE, 2,2’,4,4’,5-pentaBDE, and 2,2’,4,4’,5,5’-hexaBDE. However, EPA assigns a classification of “suggestive evidence of carcinogenic potential” for decaBDE. The Department of Health and Human Services has not classified PBDEs as carcinogens. The American Conference of Governmental Industrial Hygienists (ACGIH) has no data regarding cancer classifications for PBDEs.

Case studies
PBDEs have been shown to have hormone-disrupting effects, in particular, on estrogen and thyroid hormones. A 2009 animal study conducted by the US Environmental Protection Agency (EPA) demonstrates that deiodination, active transport, sulfation, and glucuronidation may be involved in disruption of thyroid homeostasis after perinatal exposure to PBDEs during critical developmental time points in utero and shortly after birth. The adverse effects on hepatic mechanism of thyroid hormone disruption during development have been shown to persist into adulthood. The EPA noted that PBDEs are particularly toxic to the developing brains of animals. Peer-reviewed studies have shown that even a single dose administered to mice during development of the brain can cause permanent changes in behavior, including hyperactivity.

Swedish scientists first reported substances related to pentaBDE were accumulating in human breast milk. Studies by the Swedish Society for Nature Conservation found for the first time very high levels of more highly brominated PBDEs (BDE-209) in eggs of peregrine falcons.  Two forms of PBDEs, penta- and octaBDE, are no longer manufactured in the United States because of health and safety concerns. Based on a comprehensive risk assessment under the Existing Substances Regulation 793/93/EEC, the European Union has completely banned the use of penta- and octaBDE since 2004. However, both chemicals are still found in furniture and foam items made before the phase-out was completed. The most common PBDEs used in electronics are decaBDE. DecaBDE is banned in Europe for this use and in some U.S. states. For PBDE, EPA has set reference dose of 7 micrograms per kilogram of body weight, which is "believed to be without appreciable effects". However, Linda Birnbaum, PhD, a senior toxicologist formerly with the EPA (now at NIEHS) notes concern: "What I see is another piece of evidence that supports the fact that levels of these chemicals in children appear to be higher than the levels in their parents; I think this study raises a red flag." A previous study by the Environmental Working Group in 2003 published test results showing that the average level of fire-retardants in breast milk from 20 American mothers was 75 times higher than the average levels measured in Europe.

Increasing levels of PBDEs in the environment may be responsible for the increasing incidence of feline hyperthyroidism.  A study in 2007 found PBDE levels in cats 20- to 100-fold greater than median levels in U.S. adults, although it was not adequately powered to establish an association between hyperthyroid cats and serum PBDE levels. Subsequent studies have indeed found such an association.

An experiment conducted at Woods Hole Oceanographic Institution in 2005 showed that the isotopic signature of methoxy-PBDEs found in whale blubber contained carbon-14, the naturally occurring radioactive isotope of carbon. Methoxy-PBDEs are produced by some marine species. If the methoxy-PBDEs in the whale had come from artificial (human-made) sources, they would have contained only stable isotopes of carbon because virtually all PBDEs that are produced artificially use petroleum as the source of carbon; all carbon-14 would have long since completely decayed from that source. The isotopic signatures of the PBDEs themselves were not evaluated. The carbon-14 may instead be in methoxy groups enzymatically added to man-made PBDEs.

A 2010 study found that children with higher concentrations of PBDE congeners 47, 99 and 100 in their umbilical cord blood at birth scored lower on tests of mental and physical development between the ages of one and six. Developmental effects were particularly evident at four years of age, when verbal and full IQ scores were reduced 5.5 to 8.0 points for those with the highest prenatal exposures after correcting for sex, ethnicity, tobacco smoke exposure, and mother's IQ.

Sediment contamination
Increasing environmental concentrations and changing distributions of PBDEs in sediments of the Clyde River Estuary in Scotland, UK have been assessed. Analysis of six sediment cores each of 1 m depth from Glasgow city to Greenock revealed that total concentrations increased toward the river bed surface (0–10 cm). Amounts of PBDE ranged from 1 to 2,645 µg/kg (dry wt. sediment) with a mean of 287 µg/kg (dry wt. sediment). Down-core PBDE congener profiles showed that higher concentrations were due to elevated levels of BDE-209. The majority of the sediment records clearly showed a change from mainly lower molecular weight BDEs 47,99, 183, 153 at lower depths to BDE-209 near the surface, a change in congener and homologue group patterns that corresponds to the restrictions of penta- and octaBDE commercial mixtures under EU law in 2004–2006.

While biodegradation is not considered the main pathway for PBDEs, photolysis and pyrolysis can be of interest in studies of transformation of PBDEs.

Regulations of PBDEs
In August, 2003, the State of California outlawed the sale of penta- and octaBDE and products containing them, effective January 1, 2008.  PBDEs are ubiquitous in the environment, and, according to the EPA, exposure may pose health risks. According to U.S. EPA's Integrated Risk Information System, evidence indicates that PBDEs may possess liver toxicity, thyroid toxicity, and neurodevelopmental toxicity. In June 2008, the U.S. EPA set a safe daily exposure level ranging from 0.1 to 7 ug per kg body weight per day for the four most common PBDE congeners. In April 2007, the legislature of the state of Washington passed a bill banning the use of PBDEs. The State of Maine Department of Environmental Protection found that all PBDEs should be banned.  In May 2007, the legislature of the state of Maine passed a bill phasing out the use of decaPBDE.

The European Union decided to ban the use of two classes of flame retardants, in particular, PBDEs and polybrominated biphenyls (PBBs) in electric and electronic devices. This ban was formalised in the RoHS Directive, and an upper limit of 1 g/kg for the sum of PBBs and PBDEs was set. In February 2009, the Institute for Reference Materials and Measurements released two certified reference materials to help analytical laboratories better detect these two classes of flame retardants. The reference materials were custom-made to contain all relevant PBDEs and PBBs at levels close to the legal limit.

At an international level, in May 2009 the Parties of the Stockholm Convention on Persistent Organic Pollutants (POPs) decided to list commercial pentaBDE and commercial octaBDE as POP substances. This listing is due to the properties of hexaBDE and heptaBDE, which are components of commercial octaBDE, and to the properties of tetraBDE and pentaBDE, which are the main components of commercial pentaBDE. In 2017, it was decided to also list decaBDE.

References

External links 
 U.S. EPA. An Exposure Assessment of Polybrominated Diphenyl Ethers. U.S. Environmental Protection Agency, Washington, DC, EPA/600/R-08/086F, 2010
 Sandy, Martha. Polybrominated Diphenyl Ethers: Recommendations to Reduce Exposure in California. Office of Environmental Health Hazard Assessment. 25 Apr. 2008 
 Polybrominated diphenylethers (PBDEs) | Pollution Prevention and Toxics (OPPT) | Prevention, Pesticides and Toxics (OPPTS). U.S. Environmental Protection Agency. 25 Apr 2008

Flame retardants
Endocrine disruptors
Bromoarenes
Diphenyl ethers